Prince Luigi Carlo Maria Giuseppe of Bourbon-Two Sicilies, Count of Aquila (19 July 1824 – 5 March 1897) was a member of the House of Bourbon-Two Sicilies.

Family
Louis was second-youngest son of Francis I of the Two Sicilies and his second wife Maria Isabella of Spain. He was born in Naples, Two Sicilies.

Marriage and issue
Louis married Januária Maria, Princess Imperial of Brazil, daughter of Pedro I of Brazil and his wife Maria Leopoldina of Austria, on 28 April 1844 in Rio de Janeiro, Brazil. His sister Theresa Christina had been married to Januária Maria's brother Emperor Pedro II of Brazil since 1842. Louis and Januária Maria had four children:

 Prince Luigi, Count of Roccaguglielma (18 July 1845–27 November 1909). Luigi married morganatically Maria Amelia Bellow-Hamel and had two children.
 Princess Maria Isabella of Bourbon-Two Sicilies (22 July 1846–14 February 1859)
 Prince Filippo of Bourbon-Two Sicilies (12 August 1847–9 July 1922). Filippo married morganatically Flora Boonen and had no children.
 Prince Maria Emanuele of Bourbon-Two Sicilies (24 January 1851–26 January 1851).

Louis died in Paris, France.

Honours
 :
 Knight of St. Januarius
 Grand Cross of St. Ferdinand and Merit
 :
 Grand Cross of the Order of Charles III, 20 March 1830
 Knight of the Golden Fleece, 30 March 1830
 : Grand Cross of St. Louis for Civil Merit, 10 August 1851
 : Grand Cross of St. Stephen, 1851
 : Grand Cross of the Tower and Sword

Ancestry

References

External links

Princes of Bourbon-Two Sicilies
1824 births
1897 deaths
19th-century Neapolitan people
Italian Roman Catholics
Counts of Aquila
Knights of the Golden Fleece of Spain
Grand Crosses of the Order of Saint Stephen of Hungary
Sons of kings